Chrysozephyrus zoa, the powdered green hairstreak, is a small butterfly found in India that belongs to the lycaenids or blues family.

Taxonomy
The butterfly was previously classified as Thecla zoa de Nicéville.

Range
The butterfly occurs in India from Sikkim to Manipur.

See also
List of butterflies of India (Lycaenidae)

Cited references

References
  
 
 

Chrysozephyrus
Butterflies of Asia